Smârdan is a commune in Galați County, Western Moldavia, Romania with a population of 3,930 people. It is composed of three villages: Cișmele, Mihail Kogălniceanu and Smârdan.

References

Communes in Galați County
Localities in Western Moldavia